The Netherlands Indies Civil Administration (abbreviated NICA) was a semi-military organisation, established April 1944, tasked with the restoration of civil administration and law of Dutch colonial rule after the capitulation of the Japanese occupational forces in the Netherlands East Indies (present-day Indonesia) after World War II.

In January 1946 the name was changed to Allied Military Administration-Civil Affairs Branch (AMACAB). After the British departure from the Indonesian arena and the disbandment of the SEAC in June 1946, the name was changed into Tijdelijke Bestuursdienst (Temporary Administrative Service).

Foundation

The NICA was established on April 3, 1944, in Australia and operated as a link between the Netherlands East Indies Government in exile and the Allied high command in the command area of the Southwest Pacific Area (SWPA). Based in (Camp Colombia) Brisbane it originally reported into the Allied command structure. Early 1944 Dutch Lieutenant-Governor-General H.J. Van Mook and U.S. General Douglas MacArthur, supreme commander SWPA, agreed that areas of the Dutch East Indies recaptured by allied (i.e. US) troops will be put under civil administration of the NICA. Due to political procrastination by the U.S. State Department, it was December 10, 1944 before the Van Mook-MacArthur Civil Affairs Agreement was officially signed.

Early activity

Still in April 1944, the first NICA detachments went ashore at Hollandia (New Guinea). NICA staff consisted of Dutch, Indo (Eurasian) and indigenous Indonesian military or militarized personnel that wore uniforms. The general management was in the hands of Colonel C. Giebel who had the rank of Staff Officer NICA (SONICA). Each detachment was headed by a Commanding Officer NICA (CONICA) responsible for local government. Before the capitulation of Japan NICA units already established civil administration in New Guinea (i.e. Hollandia, Biak and Manokwari, Numfur), the Moluccas (Morotai) and Borneo (Tarakan and Balikpapan).

U.S. support and supplies to the NICA virtually ended when it became clear that after August 15, 1945, military command was transferred from the American SWPA to the British SEAC. The 250 NICA detachments planned for Java were halted. The reoccupation of Sumatra, Java, Bali and Lombok became a British responsibility. While the rest of the islands became an Australian responsibility. On 24 August, the Dutch signed the new British Civil Affairs Investment Agreement with Lord Mountbatten's South East Asia Command (SEAC).

In September 1945, the first NICA representatives arrived in Batavia. Because the Republic of Indonesia strongly reacted to the arrival of the NICA staff and its name (Netherlands Indies) in January 1946 the name was changed to AMACAB (Allied Military Administration-Civil Affairs Branch). After the British departure from the Indonesian arena and the disbandment of the SEAC in June 1946, the name was changed into Tijdelijke Bestuursdienst (Temporary Administrative Service).

Commanders
NICA's highest commander was the Dutch acting Lt.Governor-General Hubertus Johannes van Mook (Semarang, 1894 – L'Isle-sur-la-Sorgue, 1965). His most senior adviser (1944) and second in command (1947) was the Javanese nobleman Raden Abdulkadir Widjojoatmodjo (Salatiga, 1904 - The Hague, 1992). A graduate from Leiden University and a prodigy of Professor Christiaan Snouck Hurgronje. Before the war he was a senior diplomat in both Jeddah and Mecca. In his roles for NICA he was also appointed colonel in the KNIL and the resident of the Moluccas. In 1946 he became the general secretary of state of the Republic of the United States of Indonesia. In 1947 he was acting Governor-General of the Netherlands East Indies and chairman of the Dutch delegation to the United Nations.

References

Notes and citations

Bibliography

External links
NICA (Netherlands Indies Civil Administration) online dictionary. Retrieved July 2012. Archived November 2015.
NICA issued stamps. Dai Nippon. Retrieved July 2012. Archived April 2014.

Dutch East Indies
Aftermath of World War II in Indonesia
1944 establishments in the Dutch East Indies
1946 disestablishments in the Dutch East Indies
1944 establishments in the Dutch Empire
1946 disestablishments in the Netherlands